Pockmarked Liu or Liu Mazi may refer to:

Liu Jingting ( 1587–1670), Chinese storyteller of the Ming dynasty, nicknamed "Pockmarked Liu"
Liu Mingchuan (1836–1896), Chinese official and general of the Qing dynasty, nicknamed "Pockmarked Liu"
Pockmarked Liu, a major character from Lao She's play Teahouse